Area codes 213 and 323 are telephone area codes in the North American Numbering Plan (NANP) for the U.S. state of California. They are assigned to a numbering plan area (NPA) that comprises, roughly, the area of central Los Angeles, and includes several Southeast LA communities, such as Bell and Huntington Park. The area codes designated separate NPAs starting in 1998, when 323 was added, but were combined in an overlay plan into a single NPA in 2017. Previously, just downtown Los Angeles and immediately adjoining neighborhoods were served by area code 213, and the rest of central Los Angeles used area 323. Area code 213 is one of the original area codes created with the NANP in 1947, and was split five times over the decades.

History
In 1947, when the American Telephone and Telegraph Company (AT&T) devised the initial form of the North American Numbering Plan, the state of California was divided into three numbering plan areas: 213, 415, and 916, for the southern, central, and northern parts of the state, respectively.
The area served by 213 extended from Mexican border to the Central Coast. In 1950, the boundary between 213 and 415 was realigned toward the north, requiring the southern portion of the Central Valley, including Bakersfield, to change from area code 415 to 213.

As a result of southern California's rapid expansion of telephone service during the second half of the 20th century, area code 213 was split five times in the period from 1951 to 1998. In the 21st century area code overlays have become more practical.

1951–1998: Area code splits
The first split became necessary in 1951, when most of the southern and eastern portion, including San Diego and most of Orange County, was assigned area code 714. In 1957, 213 was restricted to Los Angeles County, with most of the northern and western portions receiving area code 805. This configuration was stable for almost three decades, until 1984, when the San Fernando Valley and the San Gabriel Valley received area code 818, thus making Los Angeles one of the first major cities in the US to be split into two numbering plan areas—New York City experienced this later in the same year. In 1991, West Los Angeles and the South Bay were assigned area code 310.

In 1998, the Los Angeles NPA was divided once more, to create area code 323. Area code 213 was kept by Los Angeles exchanges 1 (Downtown/Echo Park), 7 (South Park/Exposition Park) and 10 (Westlake/Koreatown), while exchanges 2 (Silverlake/Los Feliz), 3 (Eagle Rock/Highland Park), 4 (El Sereno/Lincoln Heights), 5 (Boyle Heights/East Los Angeles), 6 (Watts/Vernon/South Gate), 8 (South Los Angeles), 9 (Hyde Park/Athens), 11 (West Adams/Jefferson Park), 12 (Leimert Park/Baldwin Hills), 13 (Hancock Park/Fairfax District) and 14 (Hollywood/Hollywood Hills) switched to area code 323. This split made 213 one of the geographically smallest numbering plan areas in the nation, covering only Downtown Los Angeles and its immediately adjoining neighborhoods, such as Chinatown. Completely surrounding 213, 323 included most of the remainder of central Los Angeles, including Hollywood, as well as several neighboring cities, including Bell, Huntington Park and Montebello.

Since 2017: Overlay codes
Despite Southern California's continued growth and the proliferation of cell phones and pagers, 213 was not projected to exhaust until 2050. In contrast, 323 was projected to exhaust in 2017. Since 213 still had an abundance of numbers available, the California Public Utilities Commission approved a plan that erased the boundaries between both area codes, converting the area to an overlay plan for all of central Los Angeles. Since this change went into full effect on July 8, 2017, telephone companies have been able to assign any available 213 numbers in the former 323 area and vice versa, and customers with 213 or 323 phone numbers have been required to dial the area code for all calls within the area. This change returned 213 to some areas that had used it for more than half a century prior to 1998.

Service area
Cities and communities in the overlay complex include:

Alhambra (mostly served by area code 626)
Bell
Bell Gardens (also served by area code 562)
Beverly Hills (mostly served by area code 310)
City Terrace
Commerce (small portion in area code 562)
Cudahy
East Los Angeles
Florence
Florence-Graham
Hawthorne (mostly served by area code 310)
Huntington Park
Inglewood (mostly served by area code 310)
Ladera Heights (also served by area code 310)
West Hollywood (also served by area code 310)
Los Angeles
Boyle Heights
Chinatown
Crenshaw
Downtown
Eagle Rock
Echo Park
El Sereno
Exposition Park
Hermon
Highland Park
Hollywood 
Hyde Park
Koreatown 
Lincoln Heights
Los Feliz
South Central
Silver Lake
Watts
Westlake
Lynwood (mostly served by area code 310)
Maywood
Montebello
Monterey Park (also served by area code 626)
Pasadena (mostly served by area code 626)
Rosemead (mostly served by area code 626)
South Gate (small portions served by area codes 562 and 310)
South Pasadena (also served by area code 626)
Vernon
View Park Windsor Hills
Walnut Park
West Athens (small portion served by area code 310)
Westmont

See also
 List of California area codes
 List of NANP area codes

References

External links

 California Public Utilities Commission's "Report on the 213 Area Code
 213 Area Code - Southern California
 323 Area Code - Southern California

213 and 323
213 and 323
Los Angeles County, California
Downtown Los Angeles
Central Los Angeles
Eastside Los Angeles
Northeast Los Angeles
South Los Angeles
Telecommunications-related introductions in 1947
Telecommunications-related introductions in 1998